The All-time Argentine Primera División table is a cumulative record of all match results, points and goals of every team that has played in the Argentine association football top division since the first championship held in 1891.

This table does not include other Argentine competitions such as domestic cups.

Positions 

Teams in italic' are current playing in lower divisions.

Notes

References

Argentine Primera División
All-time football league tables